Leyli Rashidi (born 2 February 1973) is an Iranian actress. As the daughter of Iranian actor and film director Davoud Rashidi, she started acting from early ages of childhood.

She received a Canadian Screen Award nomination for Best Supporting Performance in a Film at the 11th Canadian Screen Awards in 2023, for her performance in the film Summer with Hope.

Filmography
2002 - Without Description
2005 - Top of the Tower
2005 - Dar- be-darha
2008 - Shirin
2017 - Ava
2022 - Summer with Hope

References

External links

Iranian film actresses
Living people
Iranian stage actresses
21st-century Iranian actresses
Iranian television actresses
Actresses from Tehran
1973 births